Aliabad-e Enqelab may refer to:

Aliabad-e Enqelab, Kerman
Aliabad-e Enqelab, Qom